The 1970 World Modern Pentathlon Championships were held in Warendorf, West Germany.

Medal summary

Men's events

Medal table

See also
 World Modern Pentathlon Championship

References

 Sport123

Modern pentathlon in Europe
World Modern Pentathlon Championships, 1970
World Modern Pentathlon Championships, 1970
International sports competitions hosted by West Germany
Sport in North Rhine-Westphalia
Warendorf (district)